ICCF numeric notation is the official chess notation system of the International Correspondence Chess Federation. The system was devised for use in international correspondence chess to avoid the potential confusion of using algebraic notation, as the chess pieces have different abbreviations depending on language.

In ICCF numeric notation, each square of the chessboard has a two-digit designation. Each move is denoted by either four or five digits: the first two digits denote the square the moving piece leaves; the following two digits denote the square at which the moving piece arrives; and, where applicable, the fifth digit denotes the piece of promotion.

Details

In numeric notation, each square is designated with a two-digit number via a coordinate system. The first digit describes the file and the second digit the rank. Files are numbered 1 to 8 from White's left to White's right, and ranks are numbered 1 to 8 from White's near side to White's far side. A move is defined by pairing two square designations together, one for the starting square and one for the ending square. For example, the move that would be written 1.e4 in algebraic notation would be written 1. 5254 in numeric notation: the pawn starts from square 52 (file 5, rank 2) and moves to square 54 (file 5, rank 4). Numeric notation does not specifically mark the type of moving piece, or checks; every move is written as four digits unless resulting in promotion.

For promotion, a fifth digit is added to the move's notation: 1 for queen, 2 for rook, 3 for bishop, and 4 for knight. For instance, a pawn on f7 moving to f8 and promoting to a rook would be written as 67682. A variant four-digit notation where the ending rank is omitted (because it is always 8 for White and 1 for Black) also exists (e.g. 6762); however, this is considered confusing and contradicts the standard.

Castling is written using the king's start position and end position. Castling  is written as 5171 for White and 5878 for Black, and castling  is written as 5131 for White and 5838 for Black. The rook's start and end positions are implied.

History
German professor J. W. D. Wildt of Göttingen devised numeric notation circa 1803. Johann Koch used the system 25 years later; the system is sometimes named after him. Ivan Savenkov supported its use in 1877, and it bears his name in Russia.

See also
Descriptive notation
Forsyth–Edwards Notation
Portable Game Notation

References

External links
ICCF Laws of Correspondence Chess
article on ICCF notation

Chess notation
Correspondence chess